Kraakman is a surname. Notable people with the surname include:

 Bernadette Kraakman (born 1959), Dutch singer, professionally known as Bernadette
 Maria Kraakman (born 1975), Dutch actress